Bynum is an unincorporated community and census-designated place in Teton County, Montana, United States, approximately 13 miles north of Choteau. Its population was 31 as of the 2010 census.

Bynum is the site of a one-room country school, a general store, post office, an agate shop, and Two Medicine Dinosaur Center, which provides displays and educational programs about dinosaurs.

The town's name is derived from the surname of a family of early settlers in the area. The post office was established in 1885. In 1908 work on the Bynum Reservoir began.

In 2017, the NBC Today Show produced a segment highlighting Bynum's school and its tradition of starting each school day with a song and a dance.

Demographics

Notes

External links
Bynum, Montana

Census-designated places in Teton County, Montana
Unincorporated communities in Teton County, Montana
Unincorporated communities in Montana